Kissel Hill is a very small unincorporated community located in Warwick Township in Lancaster County, Pennsylvania.  Kissel Hill is located just south of Lititz.

References 

Unincorporated communities in Lancaster County, Pennsylvania
Unincorporated communities in Pennsylvania